The Hubbard Monoplane (Hubbard II), also nicknamed "Mike", was an early aircraft designed by John McCurdy and built by the Canadian Aerodrome Company.

The Hubbard Monoplane was commissioned by Gardiner Greene Hubbard II of Boston. The monoplane was constructed at the Beinn Bhreagh estate of Alexander Graham Bell in Baddeck, Nova Scotia, by John McCurdy and F. W. "Casey" Baldwin. The aircraft was the third to be built by the Canadian Aerodrome Company, and the first to represent an indigenous design, although loosely based on the Blériot XI. The aircraft made two brief flights on 3 March 1910, flown by McCurdy.

After it was shipped to Montreal for the 1910 Montreal Air Meet, Hubbard was unsuccessful in flying the aircraft, it possibly being too low-powered to do more than taxiing. Shortly after, Hubbard had the aircraft dismantled and shipped to Boston, making it the first Canadian aircraft sold and built for export. The intent was to enter the aircraft at the Harvard-Boston Aero Meet in Boston. The aircraft was displayed at the aero meet, and was included in the photographs of the flight line, but it did not leave the ground.

Specifications (Baddeck No. 2)

References
Notes

Citations

Bibliography

 Green, H. Gordon. The Silver Dart: The Authentic Story of the Hon. J.A.D. McCurdy, Canada's First Pilot. Fredericton, New Brunswick: Atlantic Advocate Book, 1959.
 Harding, Les. McCurdy and the Silver Dart. Sydney, Nova Scotia: University College of Cape Breton, 1998. .
 Milberry, Larry. Aviation in Canada: The Pioneer Decades, Vol. 1. Toronto: CANAV Books, 2008. .
 Molson, Ken M. and Harold A. Taylor. Canadian Aircraft Since 1909. Stittsville, Ontario: Canada's Wings, Inc., 1982. .
 Skaarup, Harold A. Canadian Warplanes. Bloomington, Indiana: IUniverse, 2009. .

External links
 Baddeck no. 2 in Flight, 9 April 1910
 Their Flying Machines: Baddeck No. 1 and No. 2
 Baddeck no. 1
 Canadian Aerodrome Company

1900s Canadian experimental aircraft
Victoria County, Nova Scotia
Alexander Graham Bell
Single-engined tractor aircraft
Aircraft first flown in 1910
High-wing aircraft